Miss Potter is a 2006 biographical drama film directed by Chris Noonan. It is based on the life of children's author and illustrator Beatrix Potter, and combines stories from her own life with animated sequences featuring characters from her stories, such as Peter Rabbit. Scripted by Richard Maltby Jr., the director of the Tony Award-winning Broadway revue, Fosse, the film stars Renée Zellweger in the title role, Ewan McGregor as her publisher and fiancé, Norman Warne, and Lloyd Owen as solicitor William Heelis. Emily Watson stars as Warne's sister, Millie. Lucy Boynton also stars as the young Beatrix Potter and Justin McDonald appears as the young William Heelis. It was filmed in St. Peter's Square Hammersmith, Cecil Court, Osterley Park, Covent Garden, the Isle of Man, Scotland and the Lake District.

Miss Potter received a limited release in the United States on 29 December 2006 so that the film could compete for the 2007 Academy Awards. The film was intended to be released generally on 12 January 2007, but Variety reported that The Weinstein Company had decided to push a wider release date until after the Academy Awards on 25 February 2007. The date seemed to fluctuate a number of times, but the Weinstein Company website ultimately listed its release date as 9 March. The film received generally positive reviews, and Zellweger was nominated for the Golden Globe Award for Best Actress in a Motion Picture - Comedy or Musical. This was her sixth nomination.

Plot
The story begins with Beatrix Potter nervously packing her portfolio and narrating that she is a London spinster, and that her ambition to become a children's author meets with wide disapproval. She and her chaperone, Miss Wiggin, visit the publishing house of Harold and Fruing Warne, who decide to publish her The Tale of Peter Rabbit. Beatrix is thrilled and returns home, taking a drive through the parks to celebrate. However, it is revealed the Warne brothers think her book is ridiculous and will no doubt be a failure. The only reason they agreed to publish it is because they promised their younger brother, Norman, a project.

When Norman visits Beatrix, they make decisions about her book regarding size, colour and price. Norman admits he has never done anything like this before but has given her book a great deal of thought. Beatrix realises what Norman's brothers have done, but she and Norman become determined to prove them wrong. Norman takes Beatrix to the printer, and she has her drawings reproduced and copies of her book sold. Beatrix and Norman visit the Warne family, where Beatrix meets wheelchair user Mrs. Warne, and Norman's sister, Millie. Millie has decided that she and Beatrix are going to be friends and is overjoyed that Beatrix is a spinster, as is Millie, who believes men to be nothing but bores. The family befriends Beatrix, yet Helen Potter, Beatrix's social-climbing mother, is unhappy about her daughter spending time in the company of tradesmen.

When she returns home, Beatrix and Helen bicker about Beatrix's decision not to marry. Beatrix reminds her mother of the book she wrote, and her mother retorts she believes the venture will fail. However, the book sales are very successful and copies are displayed in many store windows. Norman encourages Beatrix to submit other stories for publication. Even Beatrix's father, Rupert, buys a copy of The Tale of Two Bad Mice after hearing how his friends at the Reform Club were buying them. Encouraged by this success and her father's support, Beatrix invites Norman and Millie to her family's Christmas party. At the party everyone enjoys themselves and Beatrix shows Norman a story she is writing especially for him, "The Rabbits' Christmas Party". She shows him a drawing from the story and shows him her studio where she writes and draws. Miss Wiggin falls asleep from too much brandy (a generous portion of which had been added to her coffee cup by Norman), and Norman plucks up the courage to propose to Beatrix. Mrs. Potter interrupts before Beatrix can reply, and they join the other guests in the drawing room. Beatrix confides in Millie about Norman proposing, and Millie encourages her to say yes. Beatrix then tells the guests of the stories she writes and they are delighted and amused. Mrs. Potter, however, can not see what all the fuss is about. As the guests leave, Beatrix whispers her agreement to marry Norman, who is overjoyed.

Norman visits Rupert Potter at his club to ask his consent and is dismissed within minutes. At the Potter household, Beatrix and her parents argue about her decision to marry Norman. Beatrix is adamant. Mrs. Potter tells her no Potter can marry into trade, but Beatrix reminds her that her grandfathers were both tradesmen. When Mrs. Potter threatens to cut her daughter off financially, Beatrix reminds them of her brother, Bertram, who married a wine merchant's daughter and was not disowned. She states she can survive on her own with her books. Mr. Potter attempts to reason with his daughter, but she tells him she wants to be loved and not simply marry someone because he can provide for her.

Beatrix inquires with the bank about her royalty earnings, wondering if she would perhaps someday be able to buy a house in the country. She is amazed and delighted to learn that her book sales have made her wealthy enough to buy several estates and a house in town if she wishes. When she returns home her parents make a proposition: that Beatrix keep her engagement to Norman a secret and holiday with them in the Lake District for the summer. If she still wishes to marry him at the end of the summer, they agree that they will not object to the marriage. Beatrix agrees to the proposition and is quite convinced that she will not change her mind, telling her parents to prepare for an October wedding.

Norman and Beatrix kiss each other goodbye at the railway station (Horsted Keynes on the Bluebell Line) and write many letters during their time apart, until one day a letter arrives from his sister Millie, informing her that Norman is ill. Beatrix travels back to London only to find that Norman has died. Overcome with grief, Beatrix shuts herself up in her room. She turns to her drawing, but discovers that her characters disappear off the page. Millie comes to visit and comfort her, and Beatrix decides she must leave the house.

Beatrix buys a farm in the country in the Lake District and moves there to resume her work. She hires a farmhand to run the farm and finds comfort in her surroundings. With the help of her solicitor, William Heelis, she outbids developers at auctions and buys many other farms and land in the area to preserve nature. In captions, it is explained that eight years after moving to the Lake District she marries William (to her mother's disapproval) and the land she purchased eventually forms part of the Lake District National Park in North West England.

Cast

 Renée Zellweger as Beatrix Potter
 Lucy Boynton as Young Beatrix
 Ewan McGregor as Norman Warne
 Emily Watson as Millie Warne
 Barbara Flynn as Helen Potter
 Bill Paterson as Rupert Potter
 Lloyd Owen as William Heelis
 Justin McDonald as Young William
 Anton Lesser as Harold Warne
 David Bamber as Fruing Warne
 Phyllida Law as Mrs. Louisa Warne
 Judith Barker as Hilda
 Matyelok Gibbs as Miss Wiggin
 Lynn Farleigh as Lady Sybil
 John Woodvine as Sir Nigel
 Jane How as Lady Armitage
 Geoffrey Beevers as Mr. Copperthwaite
 Clare Clifford as Mrs. Haddon-Bell
 Richard Mulholland as Ashton Clifford

Production
The film was director Chris Noonan's first in 10 years (since he made Babe), having waited for many years until he finally found a script that inspired him. Cate Blanchett, who originally suggested Noonan for the role of director, was at one point set to star in the film but apologetically left the project when one of her other films was green-lit before this one. Zellweger ended up becoming an executive producer on the film because she was dissatisfied with the script and wanted to get more involved.

The film was first brought to Ewan McGregor's attention by Zellweger, who had kept in contact with him after collaborating on Down with Love. McGregor described the film as having a somewhat similar appeal as that film, and noted that he was familiar with Beatrix Potter's stories, which he read to his children. To prepare for the role, McGregor studied photographs of Norman Warne and visited the modern-day Warne publishing house. Zellweger read actual letters between Beatrix Potter and Norman Warne and Millie to prepare for the role, but had difficulty with the accent, which she said was very different from Bridget Jones'.

As there were no records of Beatrix Potter's speaking voice, they had to guess; ultimately the voice was softened so as not to irritate contemporary audiences with the tight, high voice a woman of Beatrix Potter's standing at that time may have had. Zellweger said that she had read a few of Beatrix Potter's stories growing up, but that she had never known anything about the woman herself. Noonan said that when growing up he had never read Beatrix Potter's stories, and that, "I was aware of her because of all that crockery with her characters on it."

The film used animated versions of Beatrix Potter's characters and illustrations, which were composited into the live-action shots. According to Chris Knott (who had previously worked on Who Framed Roger Rabbit), VFX supervisor on the film for Passion Pictures, they were given access to collections of Potter's original work to help them recreate it for the animations. Noonan said that it was hard to find anyone who still did cel animation, but did end up finding such a person in Alyson Hamilton, who already had a great deal of appreciation for Potter's work. Costumes for the film were designed by Academy Award winner Anthony Powell. The score for the film was composed by Nigel Westlake (who had previously worked with Noonan on Babe) although Rachel Portman was brought in to record some of the music for the Lake District scenes. Westlake was asked by Noonan during filming to come up with a waltz-like tune for some of their lyrics, and, with the collaboration of Mike Batt and Katie Melua, this same song was also turned into a pop song used in the end credits of the film.

Reception
The film received positive reviews. , the film holds a 67% approval rating on review aggregator Rotten Tomatoes, based on 129 reviews with an average rating of 6.22 out of 10. The critics' consensus is that it is a "charming biopic that maintains its sweetness even in sadder moments."

Songs
 "When You Taught Me How to Dance" - Performed by Katie Melua
 "Let Me Teach You How to Dance" - Performed by Ewan McGregor

References

External links
 
 
 
 Miss Potter production blog at TypePad

2006 films
2006 biographical drama films
American biographical drama films
APRA Award winners
BBC Film films
Beatrix Potter
Biographical films about artists
Biographical films about writers
British biographical drama films
Films directed by Chris Noonan
Films scored by Nigel Westlake
Films set in the 1900s
Films set in the Lake District
Films shot at Elstree Film Studios
Films shot in Argyll and Bute
Films shot in Cumbria
Films shot in East Sussex
Films shot in London
Films shot in Stirling (council area)
Films shot in West Sussex
Metro-Goldwyn-Mayer films
Phoenix Pictures films
Films produced by David Kirschner
2006 drama films
The Weinstein Company films
Films with live action and animation
2000s English-language films
2000s American films
2000s British films